Ruben Estephan Vargas Martinez (born 5 August 1998) is a Swiss professional footballer who plays as a winger for Bundesliga club FC Augsburg and the Switzerland national team.

Club career
Vargas made his professional debut for FC Luzern in a 1–1 tie with FC Zürich on 27 August 2017.

He signed a 5 year contract with Augsburg in the summer of 2019, becoming the first Bundesliga player of Dominican descent. He scored his first goal in his second match, against Union Berlin.

International career
Vargas made his Switzerland senior team debut on 8 September 2019, in a Euro 2020 qualifier against Gibraltar. He replaced Granit Xhaka in the 74th minute.

Euro 2020 
Vargas scored a crucial penalty for Switzerland, during UEFA Euro 2020, in a penalty shootout against France on 28 June in the Round of 16 knockout stage, qualifying Switzerland for the quarter-final.
Vargas, however, later missed a penalty for Switzerland, during the penalty shootout against Spain on 2 July in the quarter-final. Switzerland would later lose on penalties.

Personal life
Vargas was born in Adligenswil, Switzerland, to a Dominican father and a Swiss mother, and holds citizenship of both nations. Vargas shares a hometown with his former Augsburg teammate and ex Switzerland captain Stephan Lichtsteiner.

Career statistics

Club

International goals
Scores and results list Switzerland's goal tally first.

References

External links
Ruben Vargas en Fútbol Dominicano. Net
 
 SFL Profile
 
 
 Swiss U20 Profile
 

1998 births
Living people
People from Lucerne-Land District
Association football wingers
Swiss men's footballers
Switzerland youth international footballers
Switzerland under-21 international footballers
Switzerland international footballers
Swiss people of Dominican Republic descent
Sportspeople of Dominican Republic descent
FC Luzern players
FC Augsburg players
Swiss Super League players
Bundesliga players
UEFA Euro 2020 players
2022 FIFA World Cup players
Swiss expatriate footballers
Swiss expatriate sportspeople in Germany
Expatriate footballers in Germany
Sportspeople from the canton of Lucerne